Mr. Personality is an American reality television series broadcast by the Fox Broadcasting Company (Fox). The series premiered on April 21, 2003, and concluded with its fifth episode on May 19, 2003. Filmed in Malibu, California, the series followed Hayley Arp, a 26-year-old stockbroker, as she selected a suitor among a group of twenty men. In an effort for Arp to select her suitor solely based on personality, all of the men were required to wear color-coded latex masks throughout the competition. Arp eliminated a predetermined amount of suitors each week until only one remained; upon selection of a final suitor, Arp was allowed to remove his mask and see his appearance. The series was hosted by American media personality Monica Lewinsky.

Mr. Personality was a part of Fox's intent to capitalize on the burgeoning success of the reality television genre. The series was given unfavorable reviews by critics, who derided the series' concept and the casting of Lewinsky as the host. The series premiered with strong ratings, however, they waned over the course of the season; the two-hour finale was condensed into a one-hour episode as a result of subpar ratings. Since the series' end, several producers and contestants have voiced their regret over Mr. Personality.

Format

Filmed in Malibu, California, the series depicted a competition among a group of 20 men for the opportunity to date Hayley Arp, a 26-year-old stockbroker from Georgia. Arp was required to select a partner from the group solely on the basis of personality. In order to do so, the men were required to conceal their appearance through wearing color-coded latex plastic masks. The men wore their masks throughout the entire competition, with the exception of one-on-one dates with Arp that were set in a dark room; during these dates, the men were permitted to remove their masks so that Arp could feel their faces. Arp eliminated a contestant each week, until only one man remained. The series was hosted by American media personality Monica Lewinsky.

Production
Lewinsky, who had become well known due to the Clinton–Lewinsky scandal, was asked by Fox to host the series in hopes that she would attract more viewers.

The masks were designed by American costume designer Tina Haatainen-Jones. The network asked Haatainen-Jones to create "a mask without any personality" that still allowed the men the ability to easily speak. Haatainen-Jones believed the show sounded "stupid", although she accepted the work due to her status as a freelance artist. In an effort to make the masks unique, Haatainen-Jones crafted them to be reminiscent of a sculpture with a beaten metal appearance. Haatainen-Jones crafted a total of 40 masks, 30 of which were metallic and 10 of which were various colors. The network additionally asked Haatainen-Jones to craft a "chastity mask", which was bound by leather straps and a padlock. As a result, the mask could only be removed with a key that the network entrusted Haatainen-Jones with. The contestants did not know about the masks until they arrived in Malibu for filming; contestant Brian Karalus stated that he believed the masks were "ridiculous".

Episodes

Reception
Lisa de Moraes of The Washington Post referred to the series as "A whole bottle of Stupid Pills."

Ratings
Mr. Personality premiered to over 12 million viewers; at the time, it was the highest viewed premiere of a new reality television show in 2003.

References

External links
  at the Wayback Machine
 

2000s American reality television series
2003 American television series debuts
2003 American television series endings
American dating and relationship reality television series
Fox Broadcasting Company original programming